The State Register of Heritage Places is maintained by the Heritage Council of Western Australia. , 86 places are heritage-listed in the City of Mandurah, of which five are on the State Register of Heritage Places.

List
The Western Australian State Register of Heritage Places, lists the following five state registered places within the City of Mandurah:

Former places
The following place has been removed from the State Register of Heritage Places within the City of Mandurah:

References

Mandurah
Heritage
Mandurah